Tsvetoslav Stankulov (born 1 February 1969) is a retired Bulgarian sprinter who specialized in the 400 metres.

He finished eighth in the 4 x 400 metres relay at the 1993 World Championships, with teammates Stanislav Georgiev, Kiril Raykov and Anton Ivanov. He also competed at the 1991 World Championships, without reaching the final.

References 

1969 births
Living people
Bulgarian male sprinters
21st-century Bulgarian people
20th-century Bulgarian people